Newnes is a surname. People with the surname are as follows:

 Billy Newnes (born 1959), British jockey
 David Newnes, Australian lawyer and judge
 Frank Newnes (1876–1955), British publisher and businessman
 George Newnes (1851–1910), British publisher 
 Jack Newnes (1895–1969), Welsh football player
 Jack Newnes (Australian footballer) (born 1993), Australian rules football player

See also
 Newnes (disambiguation)

English-language surnames